George Junus Aditjondro (27 May 1946–10 December 2016) was an Indonesian sociologist.

Life and career

Aditjondro was born in Pekalongan, Central Java and began his career as a journalist for Tempo Magazine. From 1994 to 1995, he became widely known as a critic of President Suharto's government over corruption and East Timor. He left Indonesia for Australia for seven years and was banned by Soeharto’s regime in March 1998. He became a sociology lecturer at the University of Newcastle. Previously, he taught at the Satya Wacana Christian University in Indonesia.

On his return from Australia, he wrote several controversial books. In December 2009, during the launch of his book Dismantling Cikeas Octopus, Aditjondro was accused of assault against , a member of parliament from the Democratic Party. Ex-president of Indonesia Susilo Bambang Yudhoyono expressed his concerns regarding the contents of the book. Soon, the book was taken off the shelves across the nation.

Death

Aditjondro died of stroke at the age of 70 in Palu, Central Sulawesi in 2016.

References

External links
"Chopping the global tentacles of the Suharto Oligarchy," Dr. George J. Aditjondro. 
Suharto & Sons (And Daughters, In-Laws & Cronies), George J. Aditjondro, The Washington Post, Sunday, January 25, 1998; Page C01.
 "George Aditjondro: Betah Meneliti Korupsi", KOMPAS, 15 April 2006
  "Aditjondro Gugat Kedubes Thailand", Detikcom, 12 November 2006
 , "Sisi Lain George Aditjondro", August 31, 2006 
George Junus Aditjondro: Standing by the Marginalized, by Alpha Amirrachman, The Jakarta Post, January 9, 2007
"George hit me with a book says Democrat Party official", The Jakarta Post, December 30, 2009
Witnesses quizzed in George-Ramadhan case, The Jakarta Post, January 5, 2010
Comments: 'George hit me with a book', The Jakarta Post, January 8, 2010
"Sociologist George Aditjondro dossier sent to prosecutors: Police", The Jakarta Post, February 7, 2012
 "George Aditjondro si kera yang berteriak kera", May 25, 2015

1946 births
2016 deaths
Writers from Central Java
Indonesian Christians
Indonesian sociologists
Indonesian writers
Indonesian people of Chinese descent
People from Pekalongan
Indonesian anthropologists